The gens Anneia was a Roman family known from the last century of the Roman Republic.  The gens is known chiefly from a single individual, Marcus Anneius, who was a legate of Cicero during his government in Cilicia in 51 BC, and subsequently commanded part of the Roman troops during Cicero's campaign against the Parthians.

See also
 List of Roman gentes

References

Roman gentes